Article 8 of the European Convention on Human Rights provides a right to respect for one's "private and family life, his home and his correspondence", subject to certain restrictions that are "in accordance with law" and "necessary in a democratic society". The European Convention on Human Rights (ECHR) (formally the Convention for the Protection of Human Rights and Fundamental Freedoms) is an international treaty to protect human rights and fundamental freedoms in Europe.

Right

Article 8 is considered to be one of the convention's most open-ended provisions.

Family life 
In X, Y, and Z v. UK, the Court recalls that "the notion of 'family life' in Article 8 is not confined solely to families based on marriage and may encompass other de facto relationships. When deciding whether a relationship can be said to amount to 'family life', a number of factors may be relevant, including whether the couples live together, the length of their relationship and whether they have demonstrated their commitment to each other by having children together or by any other means.

Home 
In Niemietz v Germany case the court gave broader meaning to the 'home' notion including professional/business premises such as a lawyer's office.

Private life 
For better understanding of perception of "private life" case law should be analyzed. In Niemietz v. Germany, the Court held that it "does not consider it possible or necessary to attempt an exhaustive definition of the notion of 'private life'. However, it would be too restrictive to limit the notion to an 'inner circle' in which the individual may live his own personal life as he choose and to exclude therefrom entirely the outside world not encompassed within that circle. Respect for private life must also comprise to a certain degree the right to establish and develop relationship and develop relationship with other human beings."

Case law
Article 8 clearly provides a right to be free of unlawful searches, but the Court has given the protection for "private and family life" that this article provides a broad interpretation, taking for instance that prohibition of private consensual homosexual acts violates this article. This may be compared to the jurisprudence of the United States Supreme Court, which has also adopted a somewhat broad interpretation of the right to privacy. Furthermore, Article 8 sometimes comprises positive obligations: whereas classical human rights are formulated as prohibiting a State from interfering with rights, and thus not to do something (e.g. not to separate a family under family life protection), the effective enjoyment of such rights may also include an obligation for the State to become active, and to do something (e.g. to enforce access for a divorced father to his child).
 Golder v. United Kingdom (1975) 1 EHRR 524 – A prisoner requested a lawyer because he said he wanted to sue a guard for defamation. Access was denied. This violated the right to a fair trial (Article 6 ECHR) and client confidentiality.
 Silver v. United Kingdom (1981) 3 EHRR 475 – Censorship of a prisoner's correspondence regarding conditions in prison breached Article 8.
 R v Brown [1994] 1 AC 212 – Article 8 was deemed not to "[invalidate] a law which forbids violence which is intentionally harmful to body and mind" (specifically, assault occasioning actual bodily harm as part of consensual sadomasochistic sex acts) by the UK House of Lords.
 Rotaru v. Romania [2000] ECHR 192 – Public information that is systematically collected and stored in files held by a state or its agents falls within the scope of private life.
 Pretty v. United Kingdom [2002] Article 8 extends to protect the right to die. Like with articles 9, 10 and 11, it can be interfered with provided there's valid justification, as there was in Pretty.
 Mosley v News Group Newspapers [2008] EWHC 1777 (QB) — Per Eady J, equitable breach of confidence is extended to protect Art. 8 rights.
 S and Marper v United Kingdom [2008] ECHR 1581 – Retention of DNA information in respect of persons arrested but not convicted of an offence was held to breach Article 8.
 A, B and C v Ireland [2010] ECHR 2032 – Article 8 does not confer a "right to abortion", but the Republic of Ireland breached it by making it difficult for a woman to establish whether she qualifies for a legal abortion.
 Gillan and Quinton v United Kingdom [2010] ECHR 28 – Stop and search powers granted to police under ss. 44–47 of the Terrorism Act 2000 were neither sufficiently circumscribed nor subject to adequate legal safeguards against abuse. As such, the Court found the powers not to be "in accordance with the law", in violation of Article 8.
 Birmingham City Council v Clue (2010) EWCA Civ 460 29/4/2010 – A challenge to the decision to refuse to provide Ms Clue and her family with essential support pending the UK Border Agency's determination of her application for indefinite leave to remain in the UK. In a ground-breaking decision of the Court of Appeal, the judgment extends the scope of community care provision for families subject to immigration control who seek to remain in the UK on Article 8 ECHR grounds.
 Plantagenet Alliance v Ministry of Justice and others (2014) EWHC 1662 – Article 8 did not entitle modern-day descendants of the House of Plantagenet to be consulted on the place of re-interment of Richard III.
 Zakharov v. Russia (2015) – The Court examined Russian surveillance legislation in abstracto, finding unanimously that the existence of inadequate legislation and its application in practice themselves amounted to a violation of the applicant's rights under Article 8.
 The Northern Ireland Human Rights Commission's Application [2015] NIQB 96 – Northern Ireland's criminalization of abortion in cases of fatal foetal abnormality, rape or incest declared incompatible with Article 8
Aycaguer v. France (2017) -- ECHR found France's use of biological sampling for criminal DNA databases to be a violation of Article 8 in the case of Jean-Michel Aycaguer, a french national convicted of non-violent crime. Importantly, the court did not find the entire practice to be in violation, but claimed that the seriousness of Aycaguer's crimes did not constitute a situation wherein public interest outweighed his right to privacy in his private life.  

The notion of private life in the Article 8 is also interpreted as including some duty of environmental protection.

Cases involving LGBT rights 
The following cases deal with the applicability of Article 8 to issues related to LGBT people including the recognition of same-sex marriage, laws prohibiting sodomy, and access to health services for transgender people.
 Modinos v. Cyprus (1993) – Ruling invalidating Section 171 of the Criminal Code of Cyprus under which male homosexual acts were banned, finding that there had been a breach under Article 8 of the applicant's right to respect for private life.
 Smith and Grady v United Kingdom (1999) 29 EHRR 493 – The investigation into and subsequent discharge of personnel from the Royal Navy on the basis of sexual orientation was a breach of the right to a private life under Article 8.
 Van Kück v. Germany  [2003] ECHR 285 – Inadequate access to a fair hearing in a case involving reimbursement by a private medical insurer for costs of hormone replacement therapy and gender reassignment surgery by a transsexual woman, where undue burden had been placed upon her to prove the medical necessity of the treatment, was a violation under Article 8 and Article 6 § 1.
 Oliari and Others v Italy (2015) – Italy violated Article 8 by not providing legal recognition to same-sex couples.
R (Elan-Cane) v Secretary of State for the Home Department [2020] EWCA Civ 363 – UK courts held that issues of gender engaged Article 8 as gender was central to a person's private life.

Violation of the convention by mass surveillance
Mass surveillance, such as by the programs revealed in Edward Snowden's global surveillance disclosures, is often accused of violating the 8th article of the European Convention on Human Rights.

A 2014 report to the UN General Assembly by the United Nations' top official for counter-terrorism and human rights condemned mass electronic surveillance as a clear violation of core privacy rights guaranteed by multiple treaties and conventions and makes a distinction between "targeted surveillance" – which "depend[s] upon the existence of prior suspicion of the targeted individual or organization" – and "mass surveillance", by which "states with high levels of Internet penetration can [] gain access to the telephone and e-mail content of an effectively unlimited number of users and maintain an overview of Internet activity associated with particular websites". Only targeted interception of traffic and location data in order to combat serious crime, including terrorism, is justified, according to a decision by the European Court of Justice.

See also
 Article 10 ECHR
 Entick v Carrington
 Semayne's case

Notes

External links
 A guide to the implementation of Article 8 of the European Convention on Human Rights (PDF)
 Guide on Article 8 of the European Convention on Human Rights (PDF)

 
8
Privacy law